Swing Mob (sometimes known as Da Bassment Cru) was an R&B/hip hop collective consisting of artists and record labels first discovered by Jodeci member DeVante Swing. The artists on Swing Mob included: Missy Elliott with the group Sista, Timbaland, Magoo, Ginuwine, Playa, Darryl Pearson, Mike "Funky Mike" Jackson, Tweet, Majik, Jimmy Douglass, Stevie J, Maija Max, Bazaar Royale and Chad "Dr. Seuss" Elliot among others, although all official members had never been confirmed. A list of some known artists in Swing Mob at the time of the group's activity can be found in the liner notes of Jodeci's third studio album, The Show, The After-Party, The Hotel.

Swing Mob and formation of Da Bassment Cru 

In the early 1990s, DeVante Swing decided to assemble a large crew of rappers, singers, and producers who could sign to his Swing Mob label and collaborate. He auditioned many local groups and acts; the performers met in Swing's basement studio in Rochester, a location which inspired the moniker "Da Bassment Cru" (also a pun on bass). The group brainstormed and recorded music together in Swing's studio, ultimately aiming to produce a VHS compilation project that could market the group members to record labels. Acts who were recruited into Da Bassment Cru included the R&B groups Fayze (later renamed to Sista) and Playa; the rap duo Timbaland & Magoo; the singer Ginuwine; and a trio called Sugah. Swing also recruited record producers and audio engineers such as Jimmy Douglass and Stevie J. From 1993 to 1995, the collective crew released multiple collaborative EPs, though many of these were commercially unsuccessful. In 1994, Sista released its sole album, 4 All the Sistas Around da World; this album received positive reviews but was shelved due to a lack of commercial success. Swing Mob members also featured on film soundtracks during this period, with their music appearing in titles such as Above the Rim and Dangerous Minds.

The Swing Mob label dissolved in 1995. Artists such as Missy Elliott (who had been a member of Sista) and Ginuwine had begun to leave the group and pursue musical careers elsewhere, and other artists from the collective stated that they felt Swing was underpromoting or mismanaging them. Smoke E. Digglera of Playa has stated that artists were forced to choose whether they wanted to sign directly to Def Jam or through Swing Mob instead, weakening some acts' loyalty to the Swing Mob brand. Since the disbandment of the collective, Swing has also been accused of physically abusive behavior toward his artists; Stevie J has described an incident in which Swing purportedly entered the studio with his entourage and began slapping the artists, a situation which devolved into an all-out brawl.

The Superfriends

After the dissolution of Swing Mob, its former artists continued to collaborate. During the late 1990s, they formed a loose collective, initially called Da' Bassment; this would go on to be supplanted by The Superfriends collective in 1997. The group became much of a 'dream team' of acts within each other making hits, as described by both Missy and Timbaland, who would add a few more members to Da Bassments new family roster. Members would now included Nicole Wray, Skillz, Tweet, and rising R&B artist Aaliyah. The collective began working with each other collaborating on each other recordings keeping the features between the small unit, often appearing in each other music videos still gathering anonymously as 'Da Bassment Cru' post-Swing Mob days, but became their own creative team eventually phasing out the name and brand as they all just went by their own separate names due to their own gradual success respectively.

The first collaboration under the Superfriends name took place on Timbaland & Magoo's 1997 single "Up Jumps da Boogie", in which Elliott and Ginuwine provided background vocals and made appearances in the music video. Also providing background vocals was Aaliyah, who had become affiliated with the former Swing Mob roster after Timbaland produced her 1996 album One in a Million. Missy Elliott, who had served as a writer and background vocalist on One in a Million, went on to release her debut solo album, Supa Dupa Fly, in 1997. A critical and commercial success which featured production from both Elliott and Timbaland, this album helped to raise the profile of the collective. While affiliated with  the Superfriends collective, Playa released the 1998 album Cheers 2 U; Playa member Static Major also served as a songwriter for many other members of the collective, contributing writing to Ginuwine's "Pony" and many of Aaliyah's songs from this period. Nicole Wray and Tweet also released music during the Superfriends' period of peak activity.

Aaliyah, who had gradually become a core member of the Superfriends due to her commercial success, died in 2001. This loss shook the collective, and its members gradually began to drift apart in the aftermath.

Superfriends members 
 Timbaland (rapper, writer, executive music producer, background vocals)
 Magoo (rapper, writer)
 Missy Elliott (artist, writer, producer, background vocals)
 Aaliyah (singer, background vocals)
 Ginuwine (singer, background vocals)
 Tweet (artist, background vocals) 
 Nicole Wray (artist, background vocals)
 Static Major (contributed as songwriter, background vocals and provided demos for the artists)

The 'Superfriends' collective collaborations singles 

*Timbaland, Missy Elliott and Static Major has actively been involved in majority of the collective works, with Timbaland serving as the predominant producer on majority of the songs on multiple albums. However the three does not serve as writer and producer on every song on each albums. The 8 artists of the collective also appear and feature on multiple tracks on various albums also sharing writers credit. However many of the tracks may not have been marketed as a single, which of the above is a select few.

♦The Term Superfriends, coined by the collective crew themselves, was a reference to them being superheroes, changing music every chance they got in order to save the world, as claimed by both Missy and Timbaland. It also comes from the track "Best Friends"(Featuring Aaliyah), with Missy explaining that they would come together as super friends.  It also derives from the term 'supergroup', the collaboration of the urban R&B/Pop team being composed of music producers, writers, rappers and singers all from the Da Bassment Camp as well as solo artists who were becoming successful in their own right.

After Swing Mob
Some former Swing Mob members ultimately went on to establish their own record labels. Missy Elliott founded The Goldmind Inc., while Timbaland founded Mosley Music Group and the now-defunct Beat Club Records. After Playa broke up, member Static Major found mainstream success in writing songs for other artists including Aaliyah ("Try Again", "Are You That Somebody?"), Pretty Ricky ("Your Body"), and Lil Wayne ("Lollipop"). He eventually died in 2008 after complications from a medical procedure.

Ginuwine and Timbaland would eventually fall out with one another, but relations remain close between the other former members of the Swing Mob and Superfriends collectives.

Swing Mob discography

Da Bassment
 1993: Da Bassment Cru (Swing Mob/EastWest)

Sista
 1994: 4 All the Sistas Around da World (Elektra)

Sugah
 1997: Untitled Album (unreleased) (Swing Mob)

Mad Skillz
 1996: From Where??? (Big Beat/Atlantic)
 2002: I Ain't Mad No More (Rawkus)

Missy Elliott
 1997: Supa Dupa Fly (Goldmind/Elektra/Violator)
 1999: Da Real World (Goldmind/Elektra/Violator)
 2001: Miss E… So Addictive (Goldmind/Elektra/Violator)

Timbaland
 1995: Untitled Album (unreleased w/ Magoo) (Swing Mob)
 1997: Welcome To Our World (w/ Magoo) (Blackground)
 1998: Tim's Bio: Life from da Bassment (Blackground)
 2001: Indecent Proposal (w/ Magoo) (Blackground)

Playa
 1995: Untitled Album (unreleased) (Swing Mob)
 1998: Cheers 2 U (Def Jam)
 2003: Never Too Late (shelved) (Blackground/Def Jam)
 2009: Unreleased Compilation

Ginuwine
 1995: Untitled Album (unreleased) (Swing Mob)
 1996: Ginuwine...The Bachelor (550 Music/Epic)
 1999: 100% Ginuwine (550 Music/Epic)
 2001: The Life (550 Music/Epic)

Tweet
 2002: Southern Hummingbird (Atlantic)

Mr. Dalvin
 2000: Met.A.Mor.Phic (Maverick)

Renee Anderson
 1995: Untitled Album (unreleased) (Dajhelon/MCA/EMI/Swing Mob)

Bazaar Royale
 1995: Untitled Album (As Da Boogieman)(unreleased) (Swing Mob)
 2003: What's It All For? (Def Jam/Ruff Ryders/Bloodline)

Soundtracks
 1994: Above the Rim
 1995: Dangerous Minds
 1996: The Nutty Professor
 1998: Dr. Dolittie
 2000: Romeo Must Die

References

External links
Smoke E Digglera of Playa Interview About Swing Mob
Susan Weems tells all

Hip hop collectives
Timbaland